Teddy's Tavern, originally called the Blue Hen Garage, is a historic tavern located at Ellendale, Sussex County, Delaware, USA. It was built about 1923, as a service station catering to motorists on the newly constructed Du Pont Highway. It was converted into a roadside tavern in 1937. It is a one-story, polychrome brick building with a low-pitched gable roof, low parapet, and exposed rafter ends in a Mission/Spanish Revival style. It has a flat-roofed "porch" supported by four massive brick and concrete conical columns. The interior consists of a package store, dining areas and a labyrinth of service rooms. It is one of the few surviving service stations or roadside taverns remaining from the pre-1940 era in Delaware.

It was added to the National Register of Historic Places in 1991.

References

Commercial buildings completed in 1923
Buildings and structures in Sussex County, Delaware
Mission Revival architecture in Delaware
Gas stations on the National Register of Historic Places in Delaware
National Register of Historic Places in Sussex County, Delaware